Grover Dale is an American actor, dancer, choreographer, theater director, and publisher.

Early life 
Dale was born Grover Robert Aitken in Harrisburg, Pennsylvania, to Emma Bertha (Ammon) and Ronal Rittenhouse Aitken, a restaurateur. He studied dance with Lillian Jasper in McKeesport from 1945 to 1950. Partnering up with another dancer (Mary Lou Steele) in an aggressive rendition of "Slaughter On Tenth Avenue", he secured multiple performance opportunities in local nightclubs before getting his first professional job with the Pittsburgh Civic Light Opera in 1953.

Career 
Dale's Broadway stage debut was in the 1956 musical Li'l Abner as a dancer. He appeared in the original cast of West Side Story as Snowboy, a member of the Jets gang. Other stage credits include the role of Andrew in Greenwillow, in which he also understudied Anthony Perkins as Gideon Briggs; Noël Coward's Sail Away, where he had the juvenile lead role of architect Barnaby Slade; and in Half a Sixpence, where he played Pearce, one of a quartet of 19th century London shop apprentices around whom the show is structured.

He made his film debut in The Unsinkable Molly Brown (as Jam). He also appeared in Half a Sixpence (Pearce), The Young Girls of Rochefort (Bill), and The Landlord (Oscar). 

Dale was nominated for the Tony Award twice, for his choreography of Billy, a musical version of the Herman Melville novella, Billy Budd, and his direction of The Magic Show. As co-director of Jerome Robbins' Broadway, he shared Best Director Tony Award with the famed director-choreographer Jerome Robbins. He also received an Emmy Award nomination for his choreography of Barry Manilow's 1985 television musical Copacabana.  In 1992 he became publisher/editor of Dance & Fitness magazine. In 1999 Dale founded the website, Answers4Dancers.com, whose stated goal is "to empower dancers and choreographers to think, to grow, and to create satisfying careers for themselves..."

Personal life 
Dale was involved in a six-year relationship with actor Anthony Perkins before separating in 1971. In 1973, he married actress and dancer Anita Morris, with whom he had a son, actor James Badge Dale (born 1978). Dale and Morris remained together until her death in 1994.

Filmography

Film

Television

Stage productions
 1955 The Amazing Adele musical (dancer)
 1956 Li'l Abner (dancer)
 1957 West Side Story (actor)
 1960 Greenwillow (actor)
 1961 Sail Away (actor)
 1965 Half a Sixpence (actor)
 1969 Billy (choreographer)
 1970 Jesus Christ Superstar (choreographer)
 1973 Seesaw (choreographer)
 1973 Rachael Lily Rosenbloom (show doctor)
 1974 Seven Brides For Seven Brothers (show doctor)
 1974 The Magic Show (director, choreographer)
 1979 King of Schnorrers (director, choreographer)
 1988 Mail (choreographer)
 1989 Jerome Robbins' Broadway (co-director)

Awards and nominations 
 Tony Award for Best Direction of a Musical
 45th Tony Awards 1991
Jerome Robbins' Broadway
won shared with Jerome Robbins

References

External links 
 
 
 

20th-century American dancers
20th-century American male actors
Actors from Harrisburg, Pennsylvania
American choreographers
American male dancers
American male film actors
American male musical theatre actors
American male stage actors
American male television actors
American theatre directors
Artists from Harrisburg, Pennsylvania
Dancers from Pennsylvania
Drama Desk Award winners
LGBT choreographers
LGBT dancers
LGBT theatre directors
American LGBT actors
LGBT male actors
LGBT people from Pennsylvania
Living people
Male actors from Pennsylvania
Year of birth missing (living people)